Critical Music is a British independent record label based in north London, England.  The label is the owned and run by DJ and producer Kasra Mowlavi and releases mostly Drum and bass records.  Since it was started back in 2002, Critical Music has grown significantly and become a widely recognized name on the underground music scene.  The label has released tracks by a number of artists including Enei, Rockwell, Spectrasoul, Calibre and Break and has a reputation for finding and developing new artists.

Resident Advisor has described the label as "A wealth of innovation, growth and experimentation abounds at 170 beats per minute right now, and you can't get a much better—or more comprehensive—approximation of it all than through the discography of London's Critical Recordings."

History
Kasra Mowlavi started Critical Music in 2002.  The label's first release was a single by Dphie - Five Faces / Evolve.2 and from there Critical began slowly but surely gathering fans looking for quality, fresh drum n bass releases.  Critical's early years were more about a deeper, underground sound, but with the release of Spectrasoul - Alibi (Break remix) / Organiser in 2009, the label began to take a more dancefloor friendly turn and its profile became much more heightened.  Despite this, Critical has never given in to the temptation to mass release cheap, high speed adrenaline rush tracks that other labels have in order to bring recognition and cash.  Instead, it has gone for a more sophisticated version of the dancefloor smash with releases like Enei’s Cracker in 2011.

In 2010 the label began running Critical Sound nights at venues around the UK and Europe.  Critical now has a residency at Fabric London, and there are Critical Sound nights at clubs in other cities in the UK like Life in Brighton and Basement 45 in Bristol.

The label has gained considerable profile for its releases, a number of which have won recognition within the industry.  Mob Justice by Foreign Concept was included in KMag’s Best Singles of 2011 and the magazine said Critical ‘could do no wrong this year.’ FACT Magazine listed the Rockwell Aria EP as one of the 50 Best Tracks of 2011.

In 2011, the label signed the first of its exclusive artists, Russian DJ and producer Enei (Aleksei Egorchenkov).  Enei won the Best Newcomer Producer award at the Drum n Bass Arena awards 2011, where Critical was also nominated for Best Label. The label has also been integral in the careers of Rockwell and Sabre.

In April 2020, Critical Music were named 'Label of the Month' by Beatport.

Current Artists

 Cauzer
 Circuits
 Coco Bryce
 Charli Brix
 Enei
 Fade Black
 Foreign Concept
 Halogenix
 Hyroglifics
 Ivy Lab
 Jakes
 Levela
 Kasra
 Mefjus
 Particle
 Redders
 Rider Shafique
 QZB
 SOLAH
 Sam Binga
 Waeys
 T>I

Releases

Sister labels
In 2010, Modulations was set up as a sister label to Critical Music. Label owner Kasra described Modulations as "the DnB version of a singles club" and has emphasized the collectability of the 10" vinyl only releases which all have high quality packaging.  Artists releasing on the label include Lenzman, Dub Phizix, Vicious Circle & Jubei and June Miller. Its last release was in 2013.

Critical Music would also release 2 other series under the Critical name. Those being Binary and Systems. Both of these continue to this day.

References

British record labels
Record labels established in 2002
Electronic dance music record labels
Drum and bass record labels
Electronic music record labels
2002 establishments in England